Rudman is a Jewish surname, and may refer to:
 Brian Rudman (contemporary), New Zealand journalist
 David Rudman (born 1963), American Muppeteer
 David Rudman (wrestler) (1943–2022), Soviet wrestling champion, Sambo world champion, and judo European champion
 Laurie A. Rudman (contemporary), American professor of social psychology
 Shelley Rudman (b. 1981), British Olympic skeleton rider
 Warren Rudman (1930–2012), American politician from New Hampshire; U.S. Senator 1980–93
 William B. Rudman (b. 1940s), malacologist

Jewish surnames